Vallavanukku Vallavan is a 1965 Indian Tamil-language action thriller film, directed by R. Sundaram, son of T. R. Sundaram, and written by A. L. Narayanan. Music was by Vedha. It has an ensemble cast including Gemini Ganesan, Thangavelu, Manohar, Ashokan, Ramadas, Manimala and Manorama. The film was Modern Theatres' 100th film, and is a remake of the 1963 Hindi film Ustadon Ke Ustad.

Plot 

Ramesh is an engineer who is hunting for a job and, with the help of his friend Babu, goes to see a wealthy businessman named Laxman for a new project of his. After a song and a comic encounter with Laxman's daughter Geeta, he falls in love with her. He also achieves very good success in convincing Geeta's father into starting the project. During a site visit for the project, his suitcase gets swapped with a similar suitcase of a co-passenger named Mala, which is full of money. For this reason, Ramesh is detained in a police lock-up. Also, Mala is revealed to be part of a criminal gang. When the gang leader, Jumboo, is not able to kill Mala (because he needs a particular diary from her), he instead arranges a dangerous rowdy named Bijua Pakiri to kill Ramesh within the lock-up.

However, instead of killing Ramesh, Bijua decides to hold Ramesh captive. Together they escape the lock-up that very night to prove Ramesh's innocence. Bijua also angers the criminal gang of Mala, when he asks for a greater sum in return for killing Ramesh. When a mysterious man makes phone calls and tries to save Ramesh from captivity, Ramesh escapes by himself out into the city. The mysterious man also attacks Bijua before running away. The criminal gang try to kill Bijua, but he escapes after a fight. Geeta meets him and helps him by giving him a hanky and some milk from her flask.

Ramesh, being chased by the police, Bijua Pakiri and the criminal gang, attempts to fake his death. Geeta, believing his death to be real, comes to the waterfall, where he supposedly committed suicide and learns that he is not really dead. They both go to one of the villas owned by Geeta's father, and make a secret stay there. Bijua confronts them and threatens to kill Ramesh, but is tamed by the very pleading words of Geeta. He instead promises to help Ramesh out of the situation. Both Bijua and Ramesh don disguises to roam about in public, to search for Mala and with her prove his innocence. But, they are chased by police and are led to a comic encounter where they sing a song for a dance by Savitri. Later, Mala and Babu drive a car together and develop romantic feelings for one another. When Ramesh and Bijua get to know this, they try to use their relationship to get the truth out of Mala. But their plan backfires.

After this, the mysterious man (Gemini Ganesan) appears secretly inside Ramesh's car, promising to help him. He admits that he is a police officer when asked, and says he knows that Ramesh is innocent. But leaves when Bijua and Babu enter the car. Men from the criminal gang disguised as policemen and "arrest" Ramesh, whom they intend to murder at a safe spot. However, with the help of his friends, Ramesh escapes.
Later, the same mysterious man appears once again, and meets Ramesh to tell him that he knows Mala well and also Bijua is planning to give off Ramesh to the criminal gang for money. Ramesh believes him and starts to avoid Bijua, telling him that he now knows his true intentions.

When Mala is forced by Jumboo, the gang leader, to fly abroad, she is confronted by the still mysterious man who forces her to give him the diary, failing which she would end up in jail. But she is shot by a shadowy figure, which is then chased by the mysterious man. But, Bijua gets hold of the diary after coming there. Ramesh learns of the death of Mala and becomes sad. Jumboo arrives there, and Bijua confronts him, now asking for twice the earlier amount for the diary and the life of Ramesh.

Bijua takes Ramesh with him to prove his innocence, after pleading with Ramesh and Geeta for a long time. They arrive at a cave on a hill. There Bijua tries to sell Ramesh and the diary for the agreed sum, apparently betraying Ramesh. The mysterious man arrives at the scene to whom Ramesh explains the situation.

When the mysterious man tries to act his police disguise there, Bijua reveals he is Mr. Prakash, the true leader of the crime gang, and he himself is Inspector Sekar of Vigilance Branch. With this information, both Prakash and Ramesh are startled. After some talk, an elaborate fight and chase, Mr. Prakash drives a boat that crashes into a rock, killing him. Ramesh is proven innocent through the information in the diary.

Bijua (now Inspector Sekar) attends the wedding of Ramesh and Geeta in full inspector uniform. The film ends with Babu receiving a prize sum from the Police Department for his help in the case.

Cast 
 Gemini Ganesan as Prakash
Thangavelu as Babu
Manohar as Pichua Pakiri / Inspector Seker
S. A. Ashokan as Ramesh
Ramadas as Jambu
 Manimala as Geeta
 Manorama as Mala
 Savitri Ganesan as herself (cameo)
 T. P. Muthulakshmi as announcer

Production 
Vallavanukku Vallavan is a remake of the Hindi film Ustadon Ke Ustad, and the 100th production of Modern Theatres. Cinematography was handled by S. D. Lal, who shot the film using an Arriflex 2C. Gemini Ganesan portrayed a negative role, in contrast to the positive roles he was previously known for, while Ashokan was also cast against type by playing a positive character.

Soundtrack 
Music was composed by Vedha and lyrics were written by Kannadasan and Panchu Arunachalam. The song "Manam Ennum" is based on "Sau Saal Pehle" from the 1961 Hindi film Jab Pyar Kisi Se Hota Hai, and "Or Aayiram Paarvaiyile" is based on "Sou Bar Janam Lenge" from Ustadon Ke Ustad.

Reception 
Kalki negatively reviewed the film. It ran for over 100 days in theatres.

References

External links 
 

1960s action thriller films
1960s crime action films
1960s crime thriller films
1960s mystery thriller films
1960s Tamil-language films
1965 films
Films about organised crime in India
Indian action thriller films
Indian black-and-white films
Indian crime action films
Indian mystery thriller films
Indian spy thriller films
Tamil remakes of Hindi films